is a Latin word (meaning "let it stand") used in proofreading to indicate that a  previously marked change is to be ignored.

Stet or STET may also refer to:

 Stet (novel), a 2006 novel by American author James Chapman
 "Stet" (short story), a 2018 story by Sarah Gailey
 Stet (software), a public document commenting software 
 STET (text editor), a folding text editor
 STET (fanzine), a science-fiction fanzine 
 Securities turnover excise tax, a small tax on every stock, swap, derivative, or other trade on financial markets
 STET Homeland Security Services, a security consultancy firm based in Singapore
 STET – Società Finanziaria Telefonica, an Italian telecommunications company, today merged with Telecom Italia
 Stet, Missouri, an unincorporated community in the United States
 Stet: a memoir, a 2000 book by Diana Athill

Persons with the given name
 Stet Howland (born 1960), American drummer

See also
 Stetter